"I Love You" is a song written by Keith Follesé, Adrienne Follesé and Tammy Hyler, and recorded by American country music singer Martina McBride.  It was released in July 1999 as the first single from her album Emotion.  McBride originally recorded "I Love You" for the 1999 film's soundtrack, Runaway Bride, starring Julia Roberts and Richard Gere. The single was also included on McBride's then-upcoming album Emotion and later appeared on her Greatest Hits compilation album.

Chart performance
"I Love You" debuted at  43 on the US Billboard Hot Country Singles & Tracks chart for the week of July 31, 1999. It subsequently reached No. 1 in late 1999 and remained there for five consecutive weeks until it was knocked off by "When I Said I Do" by Clint Black and Lisa Hartman Black; it is McBride's biggest country hit to date. The song also charted at No. 24 on the Billboard Hot 100 and No. 21 on the Billboard Adult Contemporary chart. "I Love You" is McBride's highest-charting single on the Hot 100 and was her first entry as a solo artist on the Adult Contemporary chart.

Music video
The song's music video shows McBride singing in a dress at a wedding hall, with video screens of the Runaway Bride film in the background. It was directed by Gerry Wenner.

Track listings

US 7-inch single
A. "I Love You" (single version) – 2:53
B. "Whatever You Say" – 4:29

Australian CD single
 "I Love You" (pop version) – 2:53
 "I Love You" (remix) – 2:53
 "Happy Girl" – 3:27

German CD single
 "I Love You" (album version) – 2:53
 "I Love You" (single version) – 2:53

UK CD single
 "I Love You" (international remix) – 2:54
 "I Love You" (Runaway Bride system) – 2:52
 "Happy Girl" – 3:26

European CD single
 "I Love You" (pop version) – 2:52
 "Happy Girl" – 3:27
 "Valentine" – 3:13

Charts

Weekly charts

Year-end charts

Release history

References

1999 singles
1999 songs
Ariola Records singles
Bertelsmann Music Group singles
Martina McBride songs
RCA Records Nashville singles
Song recordings produced by Paul Worley
Songs written by Keith Follesé
Songs written by Tammy Hyler